Hesperia ottoe, the Ottoe skipper, is a butterfly of the family Hesperiidae.

It is found in the central U.S. but has been recorded in Canada only in a small area of southern Manitoba.

The wingspan is 29–35 mm. The flight period is from mid-June to early August.

The larvae feed on Poaceae species, Leptoloma cognatum,  little bluestem (Andropogon scoparius), and, in Minnesota, on the flowers of purple coneflower (Echinacea angustifolia).

References

External links
Ottoe Skipper, Butterflies and Moths of North America

Hesperia (butterfly)
Butterflies described in 1866
Butterflies of North America